Jesse Novak is an American composer, best-known for his work scoring television shows, including The Mindy Project, BoJack Horseman, Tuca & Bertie, The Baby-Sitters Club, and Superstore. He is the brother of actor and producer B. J. Novak, and the son of author William Novak.

References

21st-century American composers
American television composers
Date of birth missing (living people)
Living people
Year of birth missing (living people)